Rafael Agudelo (born 17 May 1954) is a Colombian footballer. He played in three matches for the Colombia national football team in 1979. He was also part of Colombia's squad for the 1979 Copa América tournament.

References

External links
 

1954 births
Living people
Colombian footballers
Colombia international footballers
Association football forwards
Atlético Bucaramanga footballers
Deportivo Cali footballers
América de Cali footballers
Deportivo Pereira footballers